This is a list of 250 species in the scarab beetle genus Diplotaxis.

Diplotaxis species

References

Diplotaxis